FC Orenburg is a Russian professional football club based in Orenburg. Founded in 1976, it earned promotion to the Russian Premier League in 2022–23 season.

History
It played professionally as Gazovik from 1976 to 1982 and from 1989 on. Before 1976 another Orenburg team, Lokomotiv Orenburg, played professionally, including 3 seasons in the second-highest Soviet First League in 1960–62. In 1989 Gazovik was called Progress Orenburg. Gazovik began Russian League at Zone 5 of Second League and relegated from Zone 6 from one to Third League in 1993. They stayed in Zone 5 of Third League until 1997 season, when they returned to third level.  They finished Ural Povolzhye (Volga Region in Russian) as runner-up in 2006, 2007 and 2008 seasons and finally promoted to the Russian First League in 2010.

On 2 May 2016, the club secured top-two finish in the 2015–16 Russian National Football League and with that, the promotion to the Russian Premier League for the 2016–17 season for the first time in club's history.

On 25 May 2016, the club was renamed from its historical name FC Gazovik Orenburg to FC Orenburg.

The club was relegated back to the second tier at the end of the 2016–17 season after losing a penalty shootout in the relegation playoffs to FC SKA-Khabarovsk. It was promoted back to the Russian Premier League after one season in the second tier. It was relegated at the end of the 2019–20 Russian Premier League season. They were forced to forfeit two games late in the season due to COVID-19 infections in the squad and play more games with a weakened line-up. On 8 May 2021, they secured a second-place finish in the FNL and return to the Russian Premier League after one season in the second tier. However, Russian Football Union rejected the club's application for a RPL license on 5 May 2021 due to the stadium not passing capacity requirements and other conditions, and their appeal was rejected on 12 May 2021. The club considered filing a complaint with the Court of Arbitration for Sport. On 24 May 2021, the club announced they will not file a lawsuit with CAS and will accept the RFU decision. They also announced that the club will begin the stadium reconstruction in June 2021 to bring it up to Premier League standards.

In the 2021–22 season, Orenburg led the FNL for most of the season, before dropping out of the direct promotion spot to the 3rd place on the last matchday. That qualified Orenburg for the promotion play-offs against FC Ufa, which finished 14th in the Premier League. Orenburg won the play-offs 4–3 on aggregate thanks to the second-leg added-time goal by Andrei Malykh and returned to the Russian Premier League after two seasons in the second tier.

Honours 
Domestic Competitions
 Russian National Football League: 2
2015–16, 2017–18

Current squad
As of 28 January 2023, according to the official RPL website.

Out on loan

Reserve squad

Coaching staff
 Manager – Marcel Lička
 Assistant managers – Ilshat Aitkulov (senior), Konstantin Yemelyanov, Radik Yamlikhanov
 Goalkeeping coach – Platon Zakharchuk
 Conditioning coach – Yevgeni Stukalov

Managers
  Valeri Bogdanov (1997–1998)
  Aleksandr Korolyov (1999–2001)
  Adyam Kuzyayev (interim) (2003)
  Andrei Piatnitski (2003)
  Yevgeni Smertin (2004)
  Aleksandr Averyanov (2006–2009)
  Ilshat Aitkulov (interim) (2009)
  Konstantin Galkin (2009–2011)
  Robert Yevdokimov (2011–2017)
  Temur Ketsbaia (2017)
  Vladimir Fedotov (2017–2019)
  Konstantin Yemelyanov (2019–2020)
  Konstantin Paramonov (2020)
  Ilshat Aitkulov (interim) (2020)
  Marcel Lička (2020–present)

Notable players
Had international caps for their respective countries. Players whose name is listed in bold represented their countries while playing for Orenburg.

USSR/Russia

Former USSR countries

Africa

Europe

CONCACAF

External links
 Official website

References

 
Association football clubs established in 1976
Football clubs in Russia
Sport in Orenburg
1976 establishments in Russia